Valeri Andreyevich Sokolov (born 29 January 1988) is a former Russian professional football player.

Club career
He played in the Russian Football National League for FC Torpedo Moscow in 2008.

External links
 
 

1988 births
Sportspeople from Yekaterinburg
Living people
Russian footballers
Association football defenders
FC Spartak Moscow players
FC Spartak-UGP Anapa players
FC Saturn Ramenskoye players
FC Torpedo Moscow players
FC Rubin Kazan players
FC Gornyak Uchaly players